Thymalidae is a family of beetles in Cleroidea. They were formerly included in Trogossitidae. Members of the subfamily Decamerinae are found in Central and South America, and are associated with flowers, while Thymalus, the only member of the subfamily Thymalinae is found across the Holarctic realm, as well as parts of the Oriental realm, like southern China and Thailand, where they are found associated with the bark of trees. It is assumed that Thymalus larvae feed on fungus in decomposing wood.

Genera 
 Subfamily Decamerinae Crowson, 1964
 Antixoon Gorham, 1886, Central America
 Decamerus Solier, 1849 Chile
 Diontolobus Solier, 1849, Chile
 Subfamily Thymalinae
 Thymalus Latreille, 1802 Holarctic, Oriental Realm

References 

Cleroidea
Taxa described in 1888
Polyphaga families